Richard Leopold Beer (3 January 1897 – 30 October 1973) was an Austrian footballer. He played in eleven matches for the Austria national football team from 1920 to 1925.

References

External links 
 

1897 births
1973 deaths
Austrian footballers
Austria international footballers
Footballers from Vienna
Association football defenders
Wiener Sport-Club